was a Gojū Ryū karate teacher who was born in Naha.

At age 13 he began to study under Higaonna Kanryō until Higaonna's death 4 years later. Higaonna had three students at the time: Juhatsu Kyoda (1887-1968), Chojun Miyagi (1888-1953), and Seko Higa (1898-1966). Kyoda went on to create his style, To'on Ryu, and Miyagi assumed the mantle of Higaonna's legacy. Higa, a policeman at the time, continued his studies with Miyagi Chōjun for 38 years until Miyagi's death.

In 1931, Higa retired from the police force and opened his dojo in the Kumoji section of Naha. Only three students of Miyagi's were allowed to open a dojo while the master was still alive: Seko Higa, Jin'an Shinzato, and Jinsei Kamiya. In 1935, Higa went to the island of Saipan to teach Goju-ryu at the request of a friend. The move was not successful and Higa returned to Okinawa two years later.

Among Higa's students were Choboku Takamine, his son Seikichi Higa (who carried on his father's dojo in Okinawa), Kanki Izumigawa who spread Goju-Ryu in mainland Japan Kawasaki area, Seiichi Akamine (creator of the Ken-Shin-Kan, spread Karate-do in South America). Seikichi Toguchi (creator of the Shoreikan), Zenshu Toyama (creator of the Shinjikan),  Choyu Kiyuna, Seitoku Matayoshi, Seiko Fukuchi (1919-1975), Eiki Kurashita, Zensei Gushiken, Izumi, Hokama Tetsuhiro and others that carried on the Goju-ryu Kokusai Karate Kobudo Renmei.

The Goju-ryu Kokusai Karate Kobudo Renmei ("Goju-ryu International Karate Kobudo Federation") is a tightly knit organization founded by Seko Higa and run with corporate efficiency with a president, vice-president, and secretary. Its first president was Seiko Higa himself, who ran it from 1960 to 1966. The next president was Uemon Tetsuo, who ran it from 1966 to 1967; the third generation was Takamine Choboku, who held office from 1967 to 1989. Higa's son, Sekichi, was president in 1990. The fifth-generation president was Eiki Kurashita until 2007. Zensei Gushiken took office in 2008. He held his office till 2019 when Akira Gushi was appointed to be the current president of the Renmei. True to its name and to the founder's vision, Higa's Federation is international in scope: it has branch dojos in Japan, Hong Kong, France, Slovakia, Czech Republic, Russia and North America. In recent years branch directors (Shibucho) were appointed in Canada (Yaro Tarana), Czech Republic (Mirek Brokes) and Slovakia (Erik Stefak).

References 

Okinawan male karateka
1898 births
1966 deaths
People from Naha
Gōjū-ryū practitioners
Place of death missing